William Kimble Cherry (born January 5, 1961) is a former American football offensive lineman in the National Football League who played for the Green Bay Packers.  Cherry played collegiate ball for Middle Tennessee State University and played professionally for 2 seasons.  He retired from football in 1987.

References

1961 births
Living people
People from DeLand, Florida
Players of American football from Florida
American football centers
Middle Tennessee Blue Raiders football players
Green Bay Packers players